Lilienstein is a highly distinctive mountain in Saxon Switzerland, in Saxony, southeastern Germany, and was once the site of a Bohemian castle. It is one of the few table mountains on the east of the river Elbe and constitutes the symbol of the Saxon Switzerland National Park.

Name 
The name is not related to the flower lily (German: Lilie) but is probably derived from St. Gilgen or St. Ilgen (earlier names of the mountain were „Ylgenstein“ und „Illgenstein“). These names refer to Saint Giles.

Location 
The Lilienstein is located 15 km east of Pirna and 5 km west of Bad Schandau. It overlooks the river Elbe, which forms a 180° loop around the mountain. The Königstein Fortress is located opposite on the left bank of the river.

Mountains of Saxon Switzerland
Elbe Sandstone Mountains
Königstein, Saxony
Rock formations of Saxon Switzerland